The Revelation may refer to:
 The Revelation (Rev Theory album)
 The Revelation (Root album)
 The Revelation (Daniel Amos album), 1986
 The Revelation (Coldrain album)
 The Revelation (Applegate novel), an Animorphs novel
 The Revelation (Little novel), a novel by Bentley Little
 The Revelation (The Legend of Korra), an episode of Book One: Air of The Legend of Korra
 The Revelation of St. John the Divine or the Book of Revelation

See also
 Revelation (disambiguation)